Symphoromyia immaculata  is a Palearctic species of  snipe fly in the family Rhagionidae.

References

External links
Images representing Symphoromyia 

Rhagionidae
Insects described in 1804